Karolína Plíšková was the defending champion, but lost in the semifinals to Elina Svitolina.

Svitolina went on to win the title, defeating Aliaksandra Sasnovich in the final, 6–2, 6–1.

Garbiñe Muguruza was in contention for the WTA No. 1 singles ranking at the start of the tournament, but she retired during her opening second round match. As such, Simona Halep retained the No. 1 ranking.

Seeds
The top two seeds received a bye into the second round.

Draw

Finals

Top half

Bottom half

Qualifying

Seeds

Qualifiers

Lucky losers

Qualifying draw

First qualifier

Second qualifier

Third qualifier

Fourth qualifier

References

External links
 Main draw
 Qualifying draw

Women's Singles 2018
2018 WTA Tour